Dmitry Vladimirovich Bilozerchev (born 22 December 1966 in Moscow) is a Russian gymnastics coach and retired gymnast who represented the Soviet Union.  One of the most accomplished gymnasts in history, he is a two-time World All-Around Champion and three-time Olympic Champion. He trained at the Armed Forces sports society in Moscow.

Known for his exemplary form, style, and technique, in 1983 Bilozerchev became the youngest men's World All-Around Champion in history. He then went on to win 5 gold medals at the 1984 Friendship Games, which served as the alternate Olympic Games for the communist nations that boycotted the 1984 Los Angeles Olympics.  The following year, he shattered his leg in 41 places in a car accident.  The injury was so devastating that doctors were going to amputate the limb were it not for his status as World Champion.  In a remarkable comeback, Bilozerchev went on to reclaim his title as World All-Around Champion in 1987 even though his leg was never the same.  At the 1988 Seoul Olympics, he won gold medals in the pommel horse, still rings, and in the team competition. He took bronze in the All-Around competition after a mistake on the horizontal bar. Had the competition been held under the new life rule, where all previous scores are dropped, he would have won the gold medal over teammate Vladimir Artemov. 

In 1993 he moved to the United States. Together with his wife he owns "The United Sports Academy" in Beaverton, Oregon, where he coaches gymnastics. His son Aleksey and daughter Alice are also artistic gymnasts. In 2003 he was inducted to the International Gymnastics Hall of Fame.

References

External links

Biography and achievements
Xtreme Altitude Gymnastics
Bilozerchev(Parallel bars)

1966 births
Living people
Soviet male artistic gymnasts
Olympic gold medalists for the Soviet Union
Olympic bronze medalists for the Soviet Union
Olympic gymnasts of the Soviet Union
Olympic medalists in gymnastics
Gymnasts at the 1988 Summer Olympics
World champion gymnasts
Gymnasts from Moscow
Medalists at the World Artistic Gymnastics Championships
Armed Forces sports society athletes
Medalists at the 1988 Summer Olympics
European champions in gymnastics